The , officially the , is a Japanese aerial lift line in Hakone, Kanagawa, operated by Izu Hakone Railway. The line, opened in 1963, climbs Mount Koma (駒ヶ岳) from the Lake Ashi lakeside.

From 1957 to 2005 Izu Hakone Railway also operated Hakone Komagatake Funicular (駒ヶ岳鋼索線) which climbed Komagatake from east side.

Basic data
System: Aerial tramway, 2 track cables and 2 haulage ropes
Cable length: 
Vertical interval: 
Maximum gradient: 30°15′
Operational speed: 5 m/s
Passenger capacity per a cabin: 101
Cabins: 2
Time required for single ride: 7 minutes

Gallery

See also
Jukkokutōge Cable Car
List of aerial lifts in Japan

External links

Hakone Komagatake Ropeway official website

Aerial tramways in Japan
Tourist attractions in Kanagawa Prefecture
Transport in Kanagawa Prefecture
Hakone, Kanagawa
1963 establishments in Japan